Issue or issues may refer to:

Publishing
 Issue (company), a mobile publishing company
 Issue (magazine), a monthly Korean comics anthology magazine
 Issue (postal service), a stamp or a series of stamps released to the public
 Issues (American Council for Judaism), a Jewish magazine
 Issues in Science and Technology a public policy peer reviewed journal pertaining to science, engineering, and medicine

Computers
 Issue (computers), a unit of work to accomplish an improvement in a data system
 Issue tracking system, a computer software package that manages and maintains lists of bugs, etc.
 Issue log, a documentation element of software project management

Music
 Issues (band), a metalcore band from Atlanta, Georgia
 Issues (Issues album), 2014
 Issues (Korn album), 1999
 Issues, a 2000 R&B album by Somethin' for the People
 Issue VI, a 2005 thrash metal album by Dew-Scented
 "Issues" (Escape the Fate song), 2010
 "Issues" (The Saturdays song), 2008
 "Issues" (Julia Michaels song), 2017
 "Issues", a song by Mindless Self Indulgence from the 2008 album If
 "Issues", a song by Baby Keem from the 2021 album The Melodic Blue

Television
 Issues with Jane Velez-Mitchell, a nightly TV newscast on HLN
 Issues and Answers, a 1960–1981 American TV news program

Other uses
 Issue (genealogy), a legal term for a person's descendants
 Issue (periodicals), a number to indicate a particular periodical
 Social issue, a matter that influences individuals within a society
 Environmental issue, an effect of human activity on the environment
 Issuer, a legal entity that develops, registers and sells securities

See also 
 Isshu, a former province of Japan, now part of Nagasaki Prefecture
 Issue date (disambiguation)
 issuu, an electronic publishing platform
 List of global issues